Needle, Thread and Knot (Italian: Ago, Filo e Nodo) is a public artwork in two parts by Claes Oldenburg and Coosje van Bruggen in Piazzale Cadorna, Milan, Italy.

Commissioned by the City of Milan as part of the renovations of the Milan Cadorna railway station, and unveiled in February 2000, the sculpture is made of stainless steel and reinforced plastic, painted with polyester gelcoat and polyurethane enamel. The "knot" is placed in the middle of a fountain on the middle of the square while the sewing needle is on the footpath in front of the train station. According to the artists the needle pulling thread through fabric is a metaphor for a train going through a tunnel. The thread wrapped around a needle also "paraphrased" the city emblem of a snake coiled around a sword. According to the City of Milan, it is also meant as a tribute to Milan's influence in the fashion industry and the three thread colours (red, green, yellow) represent the lines of the Milan Metro.

See also
 List of works by Oldenburg and van Bruggen

References

External links

 Ago, Filo e Nodo (Needle, Thread, and Knot) at Oldenburgvanbruggen.com
 Ago, Filo e Nodo - scultura piazza Cadorna a Milano at TRAMA E ORDITO - il blog della moda (Warp and Weft - a fashion blog)
Arredo urbano. Nuova vita per i monumenti e le fontane di Milano ("Street furniture. New Life for the monuments and fountains of Milan") at comune.milano.it

Public art
Buildings and structures in Milan
Sculptures by Claes Oldenburg
Sculptures by Coosje van Bruggen